Lever Press is a university press, based out of Ann Arbor, MI. Unlike most university presses, Lever Press is not affiliated with a single university; instead, the press represents a consortium of universities, each of which helps govern and guide the press. Lever Press was founded in 2016 with the help of Michigan Publishing, Amherst College Press, and the Oberlin Group. All publications are released as open access material, with the cost of production being paid for by the participating universities. The press is a member of the Association of University Presses.

Participating institutions
Participating institutions include the following:

See also
 List of English-language book publishing companies
 List of university presses
 University of Michigan Library
 University of Michigan Press

References

External links 
Lever Press homepage

Open access (publishing)
Open access projects
Publishing companies established in 2016
Lever Press